Patricia Alvarado Núñez is an American television producer, director, and published photographer based in Boston, Massachusetts.  She has created, produced, co-produced, executive produced, written and directed television and digitally distributed documentaries, music specials and series on social and cultural issues including the American Experience PBS primetime documentary Fidel in 2004, an episode of PBS Kids' Postcards from Buster which was nominated for a 2008 Daytime Emmy Award for Outstanding Children Series.  She later served as the Creator and Series Producer of the WGBH series "Neighborhood Kitchens" which won an Emmy Award in 2014.  Patricia is currently Executive Producer of "Sing That Thing," an amateur choral group competition television series currently in its fourth season of production by broadcaster WGBH. Alvarado Núñez is also the Executive Producer of WGBH's World Channel online, television, and podcast series "Stories from the Stage" which broadcast nationally on the PBS network.

Background
Alvarado Núñez is the daughter of the executive director of the Panamanian non-profit organization Fundacion Pro Integracion and a late lead computer programmer for the National Bank of Panama.  She attended the University of Panama School of Communication where she received a Bachelor of Arts degree, and Emerson College in Boston where she received a master's degree in global marketing communications and advertising. In 1999, she married independent filmmaker and Emmy Award nominated television producer Alan Catello Grazioso who's the owner and executive producer of Grazioso Pictures, Inc., an award-winning media content production company in Boston.  In November 2012, Alvarado Núñez debuted her blog series on WGBH.org with an article entitled "Five Gluten-Free Recipes from Around the World. She was series producer of one of the United States longest-running Latino public television series La Plaza at WGBH-TV which continuously broadcast for 34 years.  At the invitation of the World Bank, Alvarado Núñez represented the United States public broadcasting industry as a panelist at the 4th International Public Media Forum "Sustainability, Inclusion and the New Latin American Reality" in Brasilia, Brazil. and the 6th International Public Media Forum in Bogotá, Colombia.  Patricia won her 5th Emmy Award on June 7, 2014 for "Outstanding Informational/Instructional Series" for her work on "Neighborhood Kitchens."

Television work
In 2004, Alvarado Núñez co-produced "Fidel," a two-hour documentary about the life of Fidel Castro.  In 2001, Alvarado Núñez's documentary Getting to Fenway aired on WGBH-TV and won Best Sports Special at the New England Emmy Awards. Alvarado Núñez produced the public television series María Hinojosa: One-on-One, a five-year running studio-based program hosted by Maria Hinojosa and distributed nationally by American Public Television, won Best National Informational Program at the Imagen Awards in Los Angeles.

Alvarado Núñez has produced interviews with notable celebrities including Tony winning playwright, American composer, lyricist, singer, actor, and Hamilton creator Lin-Manuel Miranda, Queen Noor of Jordan, entertainers Tony Plana, Phylicia Rashād, Jimmy Smits, Cheech Marin of Cheech & Chong, novelist Junot Diaz, Sapphire author of the book Push (novel), Grammy award-winning musicians Chucho Valdés, Danilo Pérez and Paquito D'Rivera, journalist Alfredo Corchado, Jorge Ramos (news anchor), and María Elena Salinas, sports legends such as Bill Lee (left-handed pitcher) and Luis Tiant, and others.

Photography work
Alvarado Núñez's photography work has been featured in print and on-line on WGBH and PBS related websites including the PBS.org website MyType2, Neighborhood Kitchens online, WGBH High School Quiz Show online (seasons 1 & 2), WGBH Digital Mural.  Her photography featured on RootCapital.org was taken in Peru, Rwanda and Kenya.  Alvarado Nuñez photography work was published twice as the front cover of the September 2013 and May 2015 editions of WGBH Explore! Member Magazine and in The Boston Globe article by Glenn Yoder in the June 19, 2012 online and print editions.

Awards and nominations
 (Won) Webby Award Winner, 2021 - Stories from the Stage - WGBH/THE WORLD CHANNEL - Boston
 (Won) Webby, People's Voice Winner, 2020 - Stories from the Stage - WGBH/THE WORLD CHANNEL - Boston
 (Won) New England Emmy Award, 2014 - Neighborhood Kitchens - WGBH - Boston
 (Won) Imagen Award, 2011 - Maria Hinojosa: One-on-One - WGBH - Boston
 (Nominated) Daytime Emmy Award, 2008 - Postcards from Buster - PBS Kids
 (Won) Parents' Choice Award, 2008 - Postcards from Buster - PBS Kids

Selected filmography

Executive Producer
 2022, 2021, 2020, 2019, 2018, 2017 : Stories From The Stage (WGBH) (Season Three  - currently in production)

Executive Producer
 2019, 2018, 2017, 2016, 2015, 2014: Sing That Thing (WGBH)  (Season One -  produced six episodes, Season Two - produced eight episodes)

Senior News Producer
 2014: WGBH News (produced 15 television, radio and online stories - completed)

Series Producer
 2013: Neighborhood Kitchens (WGBH season two - produced 13 half-hour episodes - completed)
 2011-2012: Neighborhood Kitchens (WGBH season one - produced 12 half-hour episodes - completed)
 2011-2006: María Hinojosa: One-on-One  (WGBH, APT - 5 seasons - produced 85 half-hour episodes)

Producer
 2006: Postcards from Buster ("Your Friend, My Friend") which was nominated for a 2008 national daytime Emmy Award for Outstanding Children's Series at the 35th ceremonies of the Academy of Television Arts & Sciences at Lincoln Center in New York City.

Co-producer
 2005: ''Fidel Castro - (2 hour PBS special - domestically aired on American Experience (PBS) and internationally on the National Geographic Channel)"

References

External links
 Patricia Alvarado Núñez Linked In Page
 New England Film Article
 Official Website
 MIT Press Article
 María Hinojosa: One-on-One Homepage
 Neighborhood Kitchens Blog 
 Neighborhood Kitchens Homepage
 

:es:Patricia Alvarado Nuñez

Living people
American television producers
American women television producers
American television reporters and correspondents
American memoirists
American women memoirists
Panamanian expatriates in the United States
Panamanian emigrants to the United States
Panamanian people of American descent
Emerson College alumni
Hispanic and Latino American women journalists
American women television journalists
Year of birth missing (living people)